Gintaras is a Lithuanian masculine given name. The feminine form is Gintarė. and may refer to:

Gintaras Ambraska (born 1975), Lithuanian judoka
Gintaras Andriuškevičius (born 1975), Lithuanian race walker
Gintaras Balčiūnas (born 1964), Lithuanian lawyer and former Minister of Justice
Gintaras Beresnevičius (1961–2006), Lithuanian historian of religions specializing in Baltic mythology
Gintaras Didžiokas (born 1966), Lithuanian politician and Member of the European Parliament
Gintaras Einikis (born 1969), Lithuanian basketball player
Gintaras Grušas (born 1961), Lithuanian–American prelate of the Catholic Church
Gintaras Jasinskas (born 1968), Lithuanian biathlete
Gintaras Janusevicius (born 1985), Lithuanian pianist
Gintaras Kadžiulis (born 1980), Lithuania basketball player and coach 
Gintaras Kantvilas (born 1956), Australian lichenologist
Gintaras Karosas (born 1968), Lithuanian artist, founder and President of the non-profit organisation Europos parkas
Gintaras Krapikas (born 1961), Lithuanian basketball player 
Gintaras Kvitkauskas (born 1967), Lithuanian footballer 
Gintaras Leonavičius (born 1983), Lithuanian basketball player
Gintaras Ramonas (1962–1997), Lithuanian politician
Gintaras Rinkevicius (born 1960), Lithuanian conductor, awarded the Lithuanian National Prize for Culture and Arts in 1994
Gintaras Savukynas (born 1971), Lithuanian handball player
Gintaras Sodeika (born 1961), Lithuanian painter
Gintaras Staškevičius (born 1964), Lithuanian modern pentathlete
Gintaras Staučė (born 1969), Lithuanian footballer and goalkeeping coach
Gintaras Steponavičius (born 1967), Lithuanian politician
Gintaras Šurkus (born 1953), Lithuanian balloonist and politician

Lithuanian masculine given names